The Women's Javelin Throw event at the 1988 Summer Olympics in Seoul, South Korea had an entry list of 29 competitors, with two qualifying groups (29 throwers) before the final (12) took place on Monday September 26, 1988. The top 12 and all those reaching 63.00 metres advanced to the final. All results were made with a rough surfaced javelin (old design).

Medalists

Schedule
All times are Korea Standard Time (UTC+9)

Abbreviations

Records

Qualification

Group A

Group B

Final

See also
 1986 Women's European Championships Javelin Throw (Stuttgart)
 1987 Women's World Championships Javelin Throw (Rome)
 1990 Women's European Championships Javelin Throw (Split)
 1991 Women's World Championships Javelin Throw (Tokyo)

References

External links
  Official Report
  todor66

J
Javelin throw at the Olympics
1988 in women's athletics
Women's events at the 1988 Summer Olympics